Aziz Dowlatabadi (1922 in Tabriz – 30 April 2009, in Tabriz) also known by the pen name Darvish was Iranian poet. He was the first director of National library of Tabriz and Tarbiyat library.
He died of lung cancer on 30 April 2009 and was buried in the Maqbaratoshoara.

References

People from Tabriz
1922 births
2009 deaths
20th-century Iranian poets
21st-century Iranian poets